Roderick Dallas Hodgins (1898-1959) was an Australian rugby league footballer who played in the 1920s.

Playing career
Remembered as a brilliant five-eighth, Dallas Hodgins played four seasons with North Sydney between 1920-1923. He won two premierships with North Sydney during the club's golden era of 1921 and 1922. 

He also represented New South Wales on three occasions between 1921-1922, and was very unlucky not to have toured with the 1921/22 Kangaroos.

Death
Hodgins died at Chatswood, New South Wales on 21 July 1959.

References

1898 births
1959 deaths
North Sydney Bears players
New South Wales rugby league team players
Australian rugby league players
Rugby league five-eighths
Date of birth missing